"The Court" is a song by English musician Peter Gabriel. A version of the song mixed by Tchad Blake, entitled the "Dark-Side Mix", was released on 5 February 2023. Much like "Panopticom", the single's release date was chosen to coincide with a full moon. The song's "free-form, impressionistic lyric that connected to justice" concerns the balance between the necessity of the legal system and the abuse of power that happens within it.

Versions of the song entitled the "Bright-Side Mix" (done by Mark "Spike" Stent) and the "Atmos In-Side Mix" were released. The single's cover art features the photograph "Lifting the Curse" by Tim Shaw.

Personnel

Peter Gabriel – lead vocals, backing vocals, piano, synthesizer, rhythm programming, orchestral arrangement
Manu Katché – drums
Tony Levin – bass guitar
David Rhodes – guitar, backing vocals
Brian Eno – synthesizer, percussion
Katie May – percussion
Melanie Gabriel – backing vocals
Richard Chapell – rhythm programming
John Metcalfe – orchestral arrangement, conducting
Everton Nelson – violin, orchestra leader
Ian Humphries – violin
Louisa Fuller – violin
Charles Mutter – violin
Cathy Thompson – violin
Natalia Bonner – violin
Richard George – violin
Marianne Haynes – violin
Martin Burgess – violin
Clare Hayes – violin
Debbie Widdup – violin
Odile Ollagnon – violin
Bruce White – viola
Fiona Bonds – viola
Peter Lale – viola
Rachel Roberts – viola
Ian Burdge – cello
Chris Worsey – cello
Caroline Dale – cello
William Schofield – cello
Tony Woolard – cello
Chris Allen – cello
Chris Laurence – double bass
Stacey Watton – double bass
Lucy Shaw – double bass
Andrew Crowley – trumpet
Andy Wood – tenor trombone, euphonium
Tracy Holloway – tenor trombone
Richard Henry – bass trombone
David Powell – tuba
Eliza Marshall – flute

References

2023 songs
2023 singles
Peter Gabriel songs
EMI Records singles
Republic Records singles